Bond Inlet is a body of water in Nunavut's Qikiqtaaluk Region in Canada. It lies in western Hudson Strait, forming a wedge into Baffin Island's Meta Incognita Peninsula and the western slopes of the Everett Mountains.

References

Inlets of Baffin Island